Thunderbird Mountain is located in the Livingston Range, Glacier National Park in the U.S. state of Montana. Thunderbird Mountain is situated on the Continental Divide. Thunderbird Glacier is located immediately northeast of the mountain.

Geology

Like other mountains in Glacier National Park, Thunderbird Mountain is composed of sedimentary rock laid down during the Precambrian to Jurassic periods.

See also
 List of mountains and mountain ranges of Glacier National Park (U.S.)

References

Livingston Range
Mountains of Flathead County, Montana
Mountains of Glacier County, Montana
Mountains of Glacier National Park (U.S.)
Mountains of Montana